Ivan Obrovac (born 8 December 1986) is a Serbian professional footballer who plays as a midfielder for FK Mačva 1929 Bogatić.

Career
Born in Šabac, Obrovac started out at Rad, making his senior debut in the 2003–04 season. He later played for BSK Borča, Radnički Kragujevac, Hajduk Kula, Novi Pazar and Mačva Šabac in the Serbian SuperLiga. In June 2019, Obrovac signed with Mladost Lučani.

Honours
Mačva Šabac
 Serbian League West: 2015–16

Notes

References

External links
 Srbijafudbal profile
 
 

Association football midfielders
FK BSK Borča players
FK Hajduk Kula players
FK Mačva Šabac players
FK Mladost Lučani players
FK Novi Pazar players
FK Palilulac Beograd players
FK Rad players
FK Radnički 1923 players
FK Radnički Obrenovac players
Serbia and Montenegro footballers
Serbian First League players
Serbian footballers
Serbian SuperLiga players
Sportspeople from Šabac
1986 births
Living people